The 1890 British Columbia general election was held in 1890.  The number of members was increased for this election from 27 in the previous election to 33, although the number of ridings was decreased to 18.

Political context

Issues and debates

Non-party system 

There were to be no political parties in the new province.  The designations "Government" and "Opposition" and "Independent" (and variations on these) functioned in place of parties, but they were very loose and do not represent formal coalitions, more alignments of support during the campaign.  "Government" meant in support of the current Premier; "Opposition" meant campaigning against him, and often enough the Opposition would win and immediately become the Government.

Although Labour as a party had run candidates in previous election, this election saw the first victories by Labour candidates (in Nanaimo and Nanaimo City), and a "Farmer" candidate (in the second Nanaimo seat).  There were five successful independents.

The Robson Government

The government of newspaperman John Robson received a mandate after assuming power the year before.  Robson died in office in 1892, yielding to Theodore Davie.

Byelections not shown

Any changes due to byelections are shown below the main table showing the theoretical composition of the House after the election.  A final table showing the composition of the House at the dissolution of the Legislature at the end of this Parliament can be found below the byelections.  The main table represents the immediate results of the election only, not changes in governing coalitions or eventual changes due to byelections.

List of ridings

The original ridings were thirteen in number, and Cowichan was restored to a two-member seat while New Westminster was increased to three, with the new total being 33 members.  There were no political parties were not acceptable in the House by convention, though some members were openly partisan at the federal level (usually Conservative, although both Liberal and Labour allegiance were on display by some candidates).

These ridings were:

Alberni
Cariboo (three members)
Cassiar
Comox
Cowichan (two members)
East Kootenay
Esquimalt (two members)
The Islands (formerly part of Nanaimo
Lillooet (two members)
Nanaimo
Nanaimo City
New Westminster City
Vancouver City (two members)
Victoria (two members)
Victoria City (four members)
East Kootenay
Westminster (three members, formerly New Westminster
Yale (three members)

Polling conditions

Natives (First Nations) and Chinese were disallowed from voting, although naturalized Kanakas (Hawaiian colonists) and American and West Indian blacks and certain others participated.  The requirement that knowledge of English be spoken for balloting was discussed but not applied.

Results by riding 

|-
||    
|align="center"|Thomas Fletcher
|align="center" |AlberniGovernment
||    
| rowspan=2|    
|align="center" rowspan=2 |CaribooIndependent
|align="center" rowspan=2 |George Cowan
| rowspan=2|    
|-
||    
|align="center"|Joseph Mason
|align="center" rowspan=3 |CaribooGovernment
||    
|-
||    
|align="center"|John Robson 1
||    
| rowspan=2|    
|align="center" rowspan=2 |EsquimaltOpposition
|align="center"|David Williams Higgins
||    
|-
||    
|align="center"|Samuel Augustus Rogers
||    
|align="center"|Charles Edward Pooley
||    
|-
||    
|align="center"|Robert Hanley Hall
|align="center" |CassiarGovernment
||    
||    
|align="center" |LillooetOpposition
|align="center"|David Alexander Stoddart
||    
|-
||    
|align="center"|Joseph Hunter
|align="center" |ComoxGovernment
||    
||    
|align="center" rowspan=2 |New WestminsterOpposition
|align="center"|William Henry Ladner
||    
|-
||    
|align="center"|Henry Croft
|align="center" rowspan=2 |CowichanGovernment
||    
||    
|align="center"|James Orr
||    
|-
||    
|align="center"|Theodore Davie
||    
||    
|align="center" |New Westminster CityIndependent
|align="center"|John Cunningham Brown
||    
|-
||    
|align="center"|James Baker
|align="center" |East KootenayGovernment
||    
||    
|align="center" rowspan=2 |Vancouver CityOppositionIndependent
|align="center"|Francis Lovett Carter-Cotton
||    
|-
||    
|align="center"|Alfred Wellington Smith
|align="center" |LillooetGovernment
||    
||    
|align="center"|James Welton Horne
||    
|-
||    
|align="center"|George William Anderson
|align="center" rowspan=2 |VictoriaGov
||    
||    
|align="center" rowspan=3 |Victoria CityOpposition
|align="center"|Robert Beaven
||    
|-
|-
||    
|align="center"|David McEwen Eberts
||    
||    
|align="center"|John Grant
||    
|-
||    
|align="center"|John Herbert Turner
|align="center" |Victoria CityGov
||    
||    
|align="center"|George Lawson Milne
||    
|-
||    
|align="center"|John Robson
|align="center" |WestminsterGov
||    
||    
|align="center"  |YaleOpposition
|align="center"|Charles Augustus Semlin
||    
|-
||    
|align="center"|George Bohun Martin
|align="center" rowspan=2 |YaleGovernment
||    
||    
|align="center" rowspan=2 |NanaimoLabourFarmer
|align="center"|Thomas William Forster
||    
|-
||    
|align="center"|Forbes George Vernon 
||    
||    
|align="center"|Colin Campbell McKenzie
||    
|-
|
|
|
|
||    
|align="center" |Nanaimo CityLabour
|align="center"|Thomas Keith
||    
|-
|
|
|
|
||    
|align="center" |West KootenayIndependent
|align="center"|James M. Kellie
||    
|-
|
|
|
|
||    
|align="center" rowspan=2 |WestminsterOppositionIndependent
|align="center"|James Punch
||    
|-
|
|
|
|
||    
|align="center"|Thomas Edwin Kitchen
||    
|-
|
|-
|
|align-left"|1 Premier-Elect and Incumbent Premier
|-
| align="center" colspan="10"|Source: Elections BC
|-
|}

See also 

List of British Columbia political parties

Further reading & references

In the Sea of Sterile Mountains: The Chinese in British Columbia, Joseph Morton, J.J. Douglas, Vancouver (1974).  Despite its title, a fairly thorough account of the politicians and electoral politics in early BC.

1890
1890 elections in Canada
1890 in British Columbia